In kinematics, the motion of a rigid body is defined as a continuous set of displacements. One-parameter motions can be defined
as a continuous displacement of moving object with respect to a fixed frame in Euclidean three-space (E3), where the displacement depends on one parameter, mostly identified as time.

Rational motions are defined by rational functions (ratio of two polynomial functions) of time. They produce rational trajectories, and therefore they integrate well with the existing NURBS (Non-Uniform Rational B-Spline) based industry standard CAD/CAM systems. They are readily amenable to the applications of existing computer-aided geometric design (CAGD) algorithms. By combining kinematics of rigid body motions with NURBS geometry of curves and surfaces, methods have been developed for computer-aided design of rational motions.

These CAD methods for motion design find applications in animation in computer graphics (key frame interpolation), trajectory planning in robotics (taught-position interpolation), spatial navigation in virtual reality, computer-aided geometric design of motion via interactive interpolation, CNC tool path planning, and task specification in mechanism synthesis.

Background

There has been a great deal of research in applying the principles of computer-aided geometric design (CAGD) to the problem of computer-aided motion design. 
In recent years, it has been well established that rational Bézier and rational B-spline based curve representation schemes can be combined with dual quaternion representation  of spatial displacements to obtain rational Bézier and B-spline
motions. Ge and Ravani, developed a new framework for geometric constructions
of spatial motions by combining the concepts from kinematics and CAGD. Their work was built upon the seminal paper of Shoemake, in which he
used the concept of a quaternion for rotation interpolation.

Rational Bézier and B-spline motions

Let 
denote a unit dual quaternion. A homogeneous dual quaternion may be
written as a pair of quaternions, ; where . This is obtained by
expanding  using
dual number algebra (here).

In terms of dual quaternions and the homogeneous coordinates of a point  of the object, the transformation equation in terms of quaternions is given by

 denotes homogeneous coordinates of the point after the displacement.

Given a set of unit dual quaternions and dual weights  respectively, the
following represents a rational Bézier curve in the space of
dual quaternions.

where  are the Bernstein polynomials. The Bézier dual quaternion curve given by above equation defines a rational Bézier motion of
degree .

Similarly, a B-spline dual quaternion curve, which defines a NURBS
motion of degree 2p, is given by,

 

where  are the pth-degree B-spline basis functions.

In what follows, we deal with the case of rational Bézier motion. The trajectory of a point undergoing rational Bézier motion is given by,

 

 

where  is the matrix
representation of the rational Bézier motion of degree
 in Cartesian space. The following matrices
 (also referred to as Bézier Control
Matrices) define the affine control structure of the motion:

 

where .

In the above equations,  and 

 

 

 

 

 

In above matrices, 
are four components of the real part  and
 are four
components of the dual part of the unit
dual quaternion .

Example

See also
 Quaternion and Dual quaternion
 NURBS
 Computer animation
 Robotics
 Robot kinematics
 Computational geometry
 CNC machining
 Mechanism design

References

External links
Computational Design Kinematics Lab
Robotics and Spatial Systems Laboratory (RASSL)
Robotics and Automation Laboratory

Kinematics